Kasak is a 1992 Indian Hindi-language film directed by K. Bapaiah, starring Rishi Kapoor, Neelam Kothari and Chunky Pandey in lead roles. It is the remake of Mani Ratnam's Tamil-language film Mouna Ragam.

Plot 
Divya does not love her life anymore, as her love Suraj was accidentally killed by police. Now Divya's parents want her to marry Vijay and she does it only to satisfy her parents. She informs and shows her attitude to Vijay after the marriage, but she gradually changes, due to the love showered by Vijay, but Vijay has something in store for Divya and that forms the climax.

Cast
 Rishi Kapoor as Vijay
 Chunky Pandey as Suraj
 Neelam Kothari as Divya
 Aruna Irani as
 Kader Khan as Hasmukh Sharma
 Asrani as
 Laxmikant Berde as Shayar
 Satyen Kappu as Divya's Father
 Gita Siddharth as Divya's Mother
 Jack Gaud as Inspector

Music 
The soundtrack of the film was composed by Rajesh Roshan.
"Mili Tere Pyaar Ki Chhaanv Re" – Anuradha Paudwal, Kumar Sanu
"Ek Taj Mahal Dil Me" – Anwar
"Barsa Paani Barsa" – Sadhana Sargam
"Dekha Jo Husn Aapka" – Mohammed Aziz, Sadhana Sargam
"Ek Baar Pyaar Ka" (Duet) – Amit Kumar, Anuradha Paudwal
"Ek Baar Pyaar Ka" (Female) – Anuradha Paudwal
"Ek Baar Pyaar Ka" (Male) – Amit Kumar

References

External links 
 

Films directed by K. Bapayya
Films scored by Rajesh Roshan
1990 films
1990s Hindi-language films
Hindi remakes of Tamil films